Te Ara Ātea is the sole public library in the town of Rolleston, New Zealand. It opened on 2 December 2021, and replaced the previous smaller library which shared a building with the Rolleston Community Centre.
The library consists of two stories and 2200 square metres. Te Ara Ātea is designed to be the centrepiece of Rolleston's town centre.

History 
The Rolleston public library, Te Ara Ātea, finished construction on 4 November 2021. The library opened on 2 December 2021.

The building and landscape was designed by architects Warren and Mahoney, and cost $22.7 million NZD to construct. Prior to the opening of Te Ara Ātea, the Rolleston Library shared premises with the Rolleston Community Centre.

The library has won award/s for its design.

Jonathan Coote, the project Principal on the building, says the facility has been designed closely with a great deal of engagement to allow for future flexibility: “Te Ara Ātea acts as a beacon, not only in location, but for the diverse and growing Selwyn District community it serves. The multi-functional space encourages and facilitates community gathering, activities, recreation and reflection. The design outcome that has been achieved with this project is a testament to a strong cultural narrative, coupled with a people-centric approach.”

Naming 
The name of the library/cultural centre was gifted to the community by Te Taumutu Rūnanga, and the name means "the unobstructed trail to the world and beyond." Te Taumutu Rūnanga worked in collaboration with the Selwyn District Council on the $22.7 million NZD building and landscape.

Naming controversy 
Several conversations within the community have discussed the naming of the library. Many citizens have complained that the name is not recognisable to the large majority of New Zealanders, and argue that adding "Library" under the signage would help avoid confusion. Staff are refusing the request, and members of the council have refused to comment on the matter.

References 

Libraries in New Zealand
Buildings and structures completed in 2021
Buildings and structures in Canterbury, New Zealand
Rolleston, New Zealand